Suade Hümeyra Hanımsultan ("good luck" and "red"; also Hümeyra Özbaş; 4 June 1917 – 17 May 2000) was an Ottoman princess, the daughter of Fatma Ulviye Sultan, daughter of Mehmed VI and Nazikeda Kadın, and her first husband Ismail Hakkı Bey.

Biography
Suade Hümeyra Hanımsultan was born on 4 June 1917 at her mother's mansion in Nişantaşı. She was the only child of Ulviye Sultan, daughter of Sultan Mehmed VI and Nazikeda Kadın, and Ismail Hakkı Bey, son of the last grand vizier Ahmet Tevfik Pasha and Elisabeth Tschumi. Her parents divorced in 1922 and her mother remarried in 1923. At the exile of the imperial family in March 1924, Hümeyra and her family settled in San Remo, Italy next to her grandfather, Sultan Mehmed. After his death in May 1926, they moved to Monte Carlo, and later to Alexandria, Egypt in 1929.

In 1936, Mustafa Kemal Atatürk, allowed her to enter Turkey. In 1939, a special law was passed for the return to Turkey of the three children of Enver Pasha, and the daughter of his wife Naciye Sultan from her second marriage. As Hümeyra's father had taken part in the War of Independence, she was also allowed to return to her country under the same law. The same year, she married Fahir Bey and went to America. They divorced in 1942.

She then taught Turkish at the Princeton University, where she met her future husband, Halil Özbaş. He came from a well-known family from Söke. They married in 1944, and had two children, Ismail Halim, born on 6 October 1945, and Hanzade, born on 4 October 1953. She was widowed at Halil's death in 1963 and settled in İzmir, where she lived with her mother. She was one of the founders of the Kismet Hotel in Kuşadası, İzmir. She died in Kuşadası at the age of eighty-two on 17 May 2000.

Honours
 Order of the House of Osman, 1922

Issue

Ancestry

References

Sources

1917 births
2000 deaths
Royalty from Istanbul
20th-century Ottoman princesses